Lawrence Jack Smith (born April 25, 1941) is an American politician, lawyer, lobbyist, and a former five-term member of the United States House of Representatives from Florida, serving from 1983 to 1993.

Biography 
He attended public schools in East Meadow, New York. He attended New York University in New York City from 1958 to 1961. He graduated with a Bachelor of Laws and a J.D. from Brooklyn Law School in 1964. He was admitted to the New York bar in 1964 and he commenced practice in New York City. In 1972, he was admitted to the Florida bar, and from 1974 until 1978, he was chairman of the Hollywood (Fl.) Planning and Zoning Board.

Political career 
From 1978 until 1982, he served in the Florida House of Representatives.

Lawrence Smith was a delegate to seven Democratic National Conventions from 1980 to 2004. 

He was elected as a Democrat to the 98th United States Congress and to the four succeeding Congresses. He served from January 3, 1983, until January 3, 1993. He was not a candidate for renomination in 1992 to the 103rd United States Congress.

Later career 
Smith announced his retirement from Congress after revelations of bounced checks in connection with the House banking scandal and improper use of campaign funds. He pleaded guilty on May 25, 1993, to one count each of tax evasion and filing false campaign reports and was sentenced to three months in prison.

Currently, he is a resident of Hollywood, Florida. He has practiced in New York and Florida. He operated his own law offices which were based in Fort Lauderdale, Florida, Tallahassee, Florida, and Washington, D.C. From 2012 until his retirement he practiced law with the law firm of Kelley Kronenberg serving as Special Counsel and Government Relations Liaison in Fort Lauderdale.

See also
 List of Jewish members of the United States Congress
 List of federal political scandals in the United States

References

External links
 
 LinkedIn Profile

1941 births
American people convicted of tax crimes
Brooklyn Law School alumni
Democratic Party members of the United States House of Representatives from Florida
Florida lawyers
Florida politicians convicted of crimes
Jewish members of the United States House of Representatives
Living people
Democratic Party members of the Florida House of Representatives
New York (state) lawyers
New York University alumni
People from East Meadow, New York
People from Hollywood, Florida
Politicians from Brooklyn
21st-century American Jews

Members of Congress who became lobbyists